"That Just About Does It" is a song co-written and recorded by American country music artist Vern Gosdin.  It was released in September 1989 as the second single from the album Alone.  The song reached #4 on the Billboard Hot Country Singles & Tracks chart.  Gosdin wrote the song with Max D. Barnes

Chart performance

Year-end charts

References

1989 singles
1989 songs
Vern Gosdin songs
Songs written by Max D. Barnes
Songs written by Vern Gosdin
Song recordings produced by Bob Montgomery (songwriter)
Music videos directed by Deaton-Flanigen Productions
Columbia Records singles